Chen Yingzhen (8 November 1937 – 22 November 2016) was a Taiwanese author. Chen is also notable for having served a prison sentence for "subversive activity" between 1968 and 1973.  He was active as writer from the late 1950s until his death in 2016.

The Collected Works of Chen Yingzhen is 15 volumes long, and was published in 1988. Some of his stories were also included in Lucien Miller's Exiles at Home.

Biography

Chen Yingzhen was born Chen Yongshan in northern Taiwan, the son of a devout Christian minister. Despite this, he never was a Christian himself while growing up. He was raised in what became Zhunan, Miaoli, with a twin brother, who died in 1946. Chen was arrested in 1968 by the Kuomintang for "leading procommunist activities", and was imprisoned until 1973. Chen was again imprisoned in 1979, shortly before the Kaohsiung Incident. He died in Beijing on 22 November 2016 at the age of 79 following a long illness.

Style

Some critics have seen Chen's work as featuring important moral dimensions while lacking technical proficiency.  For example, Joseph S. M. Lau said of Chen, "his output is relatively small and his style is at times embarrassing, yet he is a very important writer... Almost alone among his contemporaries, he addresses himself to some of the most sensitive problems of his time."

Thought

Chen was a supporter of the notion of a unifying Chinese national identity in Taiwan, as opposed to "nativist" writers like , who support the development of a native Taiwanese consciousness. Chen contributed to several journals as an editor and writer, and was "regarded as Taiwan's utmost representative leftist intellectual." Jeffrey C.  Kinkley noted in 1990 that Chen was "considered by many Chinese readers and critics in Taiwan, Hong Kong, and overseas to be Taiwan's greatest author."

Portrait 
    Chen Yingzhen. A Portrait by Kong Kai Ming at Portrait Gallery of Chinese Writers (Hong Kong Baptist University Library).

References

1937 births
2016 deaths
Taiwanese male novelists
Taiwanese prisoners and detainees
Prisoners and detainees of Taiwan
People from Miaoli County
International Writing Program alumni
Taiwanese male short story writers
Taiwanese twins
20th-century Taiwanese short story writers
20th-century male writers
Marxist writers